Avi Belleli (born October 27, 1963) is an Israeli singer and musician.

Biography
Avi Belleli was born on October 27, 1963, in Givatayim, Israel. He has been the lead vocalist and bass player of the Tel Aviv-based rock band Nikmat Hatraktor (Tractor's Revenge) since its formation in 1988. He also produced soundtracks for theatre, film and television. He has composed music for the Batsheva Dance Company and Haifa Theatre, and produced scores for Broken Wings, Betipul and Shtisel.

The Tractor's Revenge has made seven albums on Israeli labels, most of which have gone gold. Another of his collaborations is  "Strawberry Cream and Gunpowder," a dance piece by Israeli choreographer, Yasmeen Goder, in which Belelli plays live on stage among the dancers.

References

External links
 Avi Belleli website
 Tractor's Revenge, Official site
 

1963 births
Living people
21st-century Israeli male singers
Israeli rock singers
Israeli rock guitarists
Israeli film score composers
People from Givatayim
Male film score composers
20th-century Israeli male singers